Diadegma mediterraneum is a wasp first described by Constantineanu in 1930. It is a member of the genus Diadegma and family Ichneumonidae. No subspecies are listed.

References 

mediterraneum

Insects described in 1930